Tarasy is an abandoned settlement and former village in the Chernobyl Exclusion Zone, in Vyshhorod Raion, Kyiv Oblast, Ukraine.

History
The village was founded in the 18th century. After the nuclear disaster of 26 April 1986, it was abandoned. However, in 1999, it was taken out of a registry as it was completely depopulated being located in the Zone of Alienation. Currently nobody lives there.

Tarasy previously belonged to Poliske Raion until was abolished on 18 July 2020 as part of the administrative reform of Ukraine, which reduced the number of raions of Kyiv Oblast to seven. The area of Poliske Raion was merged into Vyshhorod Raion.

Geography
The village is located along the right bank of Uzh River, 7 km from Poliske (Habne), the former district center, and 22 km from the nearest railway station, at Vilcha. Across the river Tarasy borders with the village of Stupyscha (now part of Motiyky village), Narodytsky Raion, Zhytomyr Oblast.

Gallery

See also
Chernobyl Nuclear Power Plant

References

External links

Villages in Vyshhorod Raion
Ghost towns in the Chernobyl Exclusion Zone
Populated places disestablished in 1986
1986 disestablishments in Ukraine